Adam Moran, better known as BeardMeatsFood, is an English professional competitive eater and YouTuber. As of March 2023, Beard Meats Food has 2.6M subscribers on YouTube.

Beard Meats Food participates in eating challenges mostly in England, but has visited other parts of the UK such as Scotland and Wales   as well as competing in Major League Eating contests in North America. He is currently ranked 15th best professional competitive eater in the world, having formerly competed as an independent in the 2015 and 2016 Battle of Big Eaters World Championships for Team UK.

Beard Meats Food is a former banker, and lives in Leeds. He is a qualified personal trainer and says that competitive eating together with two hours' weight training per day has improved his body fat ratio over five years.  He has said that his catchphrase is a "nonsensical yet energetic way of announcing the beginning of the commentary"  In 2016 he was given a position as food tester by the owner of an American-style diner chain in Yorkshire, who took out £1 million in insurance on his stomach and tastebuds.

Adam Moran co-hosts the "Breaking Bread" podcast with Josh Gudgeon. This podcast is also available on YouTube in video format.

Christmas Parody Singles

On 18 December 2020, Beard Meats Food joined the race for the Christmas Number One and released a charity record, with profits being donated to the Stroke Association. The single "Garlic Bread (I Think I'm In Love)" was a parody version of Mystery Jets's 2008 indie hit "Two Doors Down", re-recorded with lyrics on a food based theme.
The video was produced by his friend and fellow Breaking Bread Podcast co-host Josh Gudgeon, who has also appeared in videos on the Beard Meats Food YouTube channel.

The following year, on 17th December 2021, he released festive follow-up single "I Want Chicken Wings", with proceeds once again being donated to the Stroke Association. The song was a parody of Canadian pop-punk band Simple Plan's "I'd Do Anything".

On 16 December 2022, Beard Meats Food's third single "I Got Cheesecake" was released.

See also
 List of competitive eaters
 LadBaby - known for releasing food based parody songs for charity at Christmas

References

External links

 Beard Meats Food Interview: Pizza & Competitive Eating

Living people
Year of birth missing (living people)
English competitive eaters
English YouTubers
People from Leeds